Termoelectrica is a Romanian state-owned company, its shares being held by the Ministry of Economy and Commerce which has as main objective power generation with thermal power plants.

Termoelectrica owns three subsidiaries with a total installed capacity of 1,717 MW and an annual average power production of 5.910 TWh, 9.64% of the total national output of Romania.

Subsidiaries

Electrocentrale Bucharest is a Romanian state-owned company, its shares being held by Termoelectrica which has as main objective power generation with thermal power plants.

Electrocentrale Bucharest owns three subsidiaries with a total installed capacity of 2,008 MW and an annual average power production of 6.759 TWh, which is 12.7% of the total national output of Romania.

External links

Electric power companies of Romania